The 2011–12 season is the ninth in the history of the Scarlets regional side. In this season, they will compete in the Pro12 (formerly known as the Celtic League), the Heineken Cup and the LV Cup.

Friendlies

RaboDirect Pro 12

Anglo-Welsh Cup

Group stage

Knock-out stage

Heineken Cup

European Challenge Cup

Statistics

Stats accurate as of match played 5 May 2012

Transfers

In

Out

References 

2011-12
2011–12 Pro12 by team
2011–12 in Welsh rugby union
2011–12 Heineken Cup by team